Raja Nareshchandra Singh (21 November 1908 – 11 September 1987), was ruler of Sarangarh state in Raigarh District, Chhattisgarh. He also served as Chief Minister of undivided Madhya Pradesh.

Early life
Raja Nareshchandra Singh was the last ruler of the Princely State of Sarangarh till the merger of his State into the union of India on 1 January 1948. The state now forms a part of the modern state of Chhattisgarh in Central India. He had succeeded his father Raja Bahadur Jawahir Singh who died in January 1946.  
Like his father, was an Alumnus of the Rajkumar College, Raipur and worked as an Honorary Magistrate in Raipur district before being inducted as the Education Minister in the administration of Sarangarh State.

Political career
After independence, he joined the Indian National Congress and won the first General Election held in 1951 for the State assembly of Madhya Pradesh. He represented Sarangarh Vidhan Sabha constituency by winning the 1951 and 1957 Assembly Election. and Pussore Vidhan Sabha constituency by winning the Assembly election of  1962  and 1967. He was made Cabinet Minister in 1952 in Madhya Pradesh in Pandit Ravishankar Shukla's ministry and was given the portfolio of Electricity and Public Works departments. He headed the team in 1954 which created a separate department within the government to take care of the welfare of the Scheduled Tribes, christened The Directorate of Tribal Welfare. He was made the first Minister for Tribal Welfare in M.P. in 1955 and continued in this post till he became the Chief Minister of Madhya Pradesh in 1969 (13 March 1969 to 25 March 1969). Disgusted with the way politics had come to be practiced, he resigned from his post of Chief Minister, from the membership of the State Assembly and quit politics. In his later years he took to social work towards upliftment of people in Chhattisgarh.

Family

His wife, Rani Lalita Devi (died 7 November 1987) was elected unopposed from Pussour assembly constituency in his place in the by-election that was held after his resignation from the assembly in 1969. He had five daughters and one son. After his death, his son Raja Shishir Bindu Singh took over as the Raja of the Sarangarh state till 7 September 2016. The current Raja, after the death of her brother, is Raja Pushpa Devi Singh. Three of the daughters entered politics: Rajnigandha Devi was a Member of Parliament (Lok Sabha 1967-71), Kamala Devi was a member of State Assembly of Madhya Pradesh from 1971 to 1989, and a minister for 15 years, and Pushpa Devi Singh was elected thrice to the Lok Sabha Parliament in 1980, 1985  and 1991. The fourth daughter Dr. Menka Devi is a doctor, medico-social worker and an educationist. She is a member of the Indian National Congress. Purnima Devi is the youngest daughter 

His grand children are Nandita Singh, Chandravir Singh (children of Late Rajnigandha Devi), Mrinalika Singh (Daughter of Kamala Devi) and Kulisha Mishra (daughter of Dr Menka Devi). Kulisha Mishra is the National Joint Secretary of The Indian Youth Congress.

References

1987 deaths
1908 births
Indian National Congress politicians
People from Madhya Pradesh
History of Chhattisgarh
Chief Ministers of Madhya Pradesh
Madhya Pradesh MLAs 1952–1957
Madhya Pradesh MLAs 1957–1962
People from Raigarh district
People from Sarangarh
Chief ministers from Indian National Congress